Dmitry Viktorovich Mikhaylenko (born 6 January 1995) is a Russian football player.

Club career
He made his professional debut in the Russian Professional Football League for FC Vityaz Krymsk on 20 August 2014 in a game against FC Biolog-Novokubansk Progress.

He played for the main squad of FC Volga Nizhny Novgorod in a Russian Cup against FC SKA-Energiya Khabarovsk on 30 October 2013.

References

External links
 

1995 births
People from Novopokrovsky District
Living people
Russian footballers
Russia youth international footballers
Association football midfielders
FC Volga Nizhny Novgorod players
FC Chernomorets Novorossiysk players
FC Lokomotiv Moscow players
PFC Spartak Nalchik players
Sportspeople from Krasnodar Krai